The 1935 Portland Pilots football team was an American football team that represented the University of Portland as an independent during the 1935 college football season. In its ninth year under head coach Gene Murphy, the team compiled a 3–4 record. The team played its home games at Multnomah Stadium in Portland, Oregon. The school had been known as Columbia University prior to the 1935 season; the 1935 team was the first to compete under the "Portland Pilots" name.

Schedule

References

Portland
Portland Pilots football seasons
Portland Pilots football
Portland Pilots football